Juanjuí Airport  is an airport serving Juanjuí, a city on the Huallaga River in the San Martín Region of Peru. The airport is owned and operated by CORPAC S.A., a civil government agency.

The Juanjui non-directional beacon (Ident: UAN) is located just southeast of the runway.

Airlines and destinations

See also
Transport in Peru
List of airports in Peru

References

External links

OpenStreetMap - Juanjuí
SkyVector - Juanjuí
OurAirports - Juanjuí
World Airport Codes

Airports in Peru
Buildings and structures in San Martín Region